Teddy Stadium is a sports stadium in the Malha neighborhood of Jerusalem. Three football teams currently use the stadium: Beitar Jerusalem, Hapoel Jerusalem, and the Israel national football team for select home matches.

The stadium is named after long-time Jerusalem mayor Teddy Kollek, who was in office during the time of its construction and was one of its prominent advocates.

History

For Beitar, the stadium was a major upgrade after years of playing at the YMCA Stadium,  nicknamed "The Sandbox". In the first stage, only the west and east sides of the stadium were built, giving it a capacity of 14,500. In 1999, work was finished on a north side which contains capacity of 8000 seats.

The stadium itself is one of the newest in Israel and one of the few that are close to meeting all European standards. It is accessible to the disabled, has modern bathrooms, and has ample concession stands, a combination that is very difficult to find in many Israeli stadiums. The stadium has 5,000 parking spots on its premises, and is connected to the Malha Mall and its parking facilities by a pedestrian bridge.

The stadium is located at the Begin Expressway and just past the Malha Train Station, which ensures convenient road and rail access to the rest of Israel.

With stands close to the pitch and excellent acoustics, Teddy Stadium has hosted several Israel national football team matches, the Maccabiah Games opening ceremony, and other public events.

A south side stand was completed on June 3, 2013, increasing seating capacity to 31,733.

Teddy Stadium was one of the venues for the 2013 UEFA European Under-21 Football Championship and hosted the tournament's 
final match.

The first official match of the Israel national football team in the new stadium was played on March 31, 2015. Israel hosted the Belgium national football team in the UEFA Euro 2016 qualifying match and lost the match by a score of 0–1.

Israel was chosen to host The 2021 IFAF Flag Football World Championship which were played at Teddy Stadium after feared high winds at the original venue, The Kraft Family Sports Campus in Jerusalem.

Supporters
During Beitar matches, the La Familia group occupies the eastern sections of the stadium. They are known for being the most vocal and controversial of fans in the venue.

Renovations 
In September 2016 a new solar system which can produce 639 kW was installed on the roof of the stadium.

In mid-2018 Jerusalem municipality announced a 25 million ₪ upgrade of the stadium which have finished at the start of 2019: 
 The players warm-up hall was renovated. 
 New ergonomic players seats were installed. 
 New professional sound system was installed on the roof.

The second phase of the renovation began in February 2019, and was completed in August 2020.: 
 Built new roof for the south stand.
 Extension of the solar system on the new south stand roof.
 Installation of new LED lights show system around the stadium.
 Built new 8 VIP boxes in the west stand.

The third phase of the renovation began in 2021, and was completed in August 2022.: 
 Replacement of 6700 remaining old seats in the north stand with new modern seats.
 Extension of the new sound system on the south stand roof.

Jerusalem municipality allocated dozen of millions ₪ more for further improvements in 2022/23:
 Installing 2 new LED screens on the roofs of the north and south stands.
 Replacement of the old stadium lighting with new LED lights system.
 Construction of new shops and restaurants outside the north-east stand.
 Dressing rooms renovation.
 VIP hall renovation.

International matches

Gallery

See also

 List of football stadiums in Israel
 Sports in Israel
 Pais Arena Jerusalem
 Jerusalem Sports Quarter

References 

Beitar Jerusalem F.C.
Hapoel Jerusalem F.C.
Sports venues in Jerusalem
Football venues in Israel
Sports venues completed in 1991
1991 establishments in Israel